Antone's may refer to:
 Antone's, a nightclub in Austin, Texas, started by Clifford Antone, nephew of Jalal Antone
 Antone's Famous Po' Boys, a sandwich shop chain in Houston, Texas started by Jalal Antone, uncle of Cliford Antone
 Antone's Record Label